ZV or zv may refer to:
 V Air (IATA airline code ZV)
 Air Midwest (former IATA airline code ZV)
 Zettavolt, an SI unit of voltage
 Zoomed video port, a unidirectional video bus allowing laptops to display real-time vide
 Zivilverteidigung der DDR, German for the Civil defense of the GDR
 ZVZV Za Rossiyu, Za Donbass!